Herbert James Clarke (10 April 1879 – 5 September 1956) was a British figure skater who competed in the 1924 Winter Olympics. He was born in London. In 1924 he finished tenth in the singles event.

Clarke was also the president of the International Skating Union from 1945 to 1953.

References

External links
 
 International Skating Union – Past Presidents at www.isu.org
 

1879 births
1956 deaths
Sportspeople from London
British male single skaters
Olympic figure skaters of Great Britain
Figure skaters at the 1924 Winter Olympics
British sports executives and administrators
International Skating Union presidents